The term "airtight" may refer to:
 Hermetic seals, also commonly referred to as "airtight seals"
 Vacuum packaging of food and other products is a kind of hermetic preservation that is sometimes called airtight packaging.
 Airtight (film), an American drama thriller film by Derek Estlin Purvis
 Airtight Games, a video game developer
 Airtight (G.I. Joe), a fictional character

See also
 Hermetic (disambiguation)
 Airtight Bridge
 Airtight Garage